Envirogreen is an Irish-based environmental services company which operates solely in the waste management industry. The company has received critical acclaim for shaking up the recycling industry in Ireland by encouraging private companies to sort and sell their recyclables rather than landfill them.

Activities
Envirogreen operates within the commercial recycling sector in the UK, Ireland. The company provides bespoke  commercial recycling services in Ireland and the UK. Envirogreen has an  89% Recovery rate which is well above the national  Irish average of 39.5%

Recycling 
Envirogreen's  activities include:
 The recycling and recovery of  Plastic, Cardboard, Paper,
 The brokerage of recyclables in the UK, Ireland 
 Design and implementation Environmental Management Systems
 Polystyrene Recycling Services throughout Ireland
 Waste Consultancy

Waste Management 
 Sorts and processes commercial recyclables, and  contaminated agricultural waste

Carbon Reduction Reporting
Envirogreen is the first waste management company in Ireland to introduce Carbon reduction reporting which allows its clients to see how much  it has saved and the equivalent number of cars taken off the road by choosing recycling rather than landfill.

See also

Recycling Services in Ireland

References

External links 

Waste management companies of the United Kingdom
Recycling in the United Kingdom
Companies of Northern Ireland